Łukawica  is a village in the administrative district of Gmina Staszów, within Staszów County, Świętokrzyskie Voivodeship, in south-central Poland.

The village has a population of  265.

Demography 
According to the 2002 Poland census, there were 282 people residing in Łukawica village, of whom 48.9% were male and 51.1% were female. In the village, the population was spread out, with 25.2% under the age of 18, 34.4% from 18 to 44, 13.8% from 45 to 64, and 26.6% who were 65 years of age or older.
 Figure 1. Population pyramid of village in 2002 — by age group and sex

References

Villages in Staszów County